Adar Poonawalla (born 14 January 1981) is an Indian businessman. He is the chief executive officer (CEO) of Serum Institute of India and Chairman of Poonawalla Fincorp. 
Founded in 1966 by his father, Cyrus Poonawalla, it is the world's largest vaccine manufacturer by number of doses produced.

Education 
Adar Poonawalla was educated at The Bishop's School (Pune) and at the St Edmund's School Canterbury followed by the University of Westminster.

Career 
Poonawalla joined the Serum Institute of India in 2001 after graduating from university. Then exporting its products to 35 countries, Poonawalla concentrated on the company's international market, new products license and getting pre-qualified by the World Health Organization for supply to United Nations Agencies including UNICEF and PAHO. As of 2015, he has helped the company export its products to over 140 countries; 85 percent of its revenues are from overseas.

In 2011, he became the CEO. In 2012, he played a major role in the acquisition of Bilthoven Biologicals, a Netherlands-based government vaccine manufacturing company. Poonawalla is a board member of the GAVI Alliance, the global vaccine alliance.

He initiated and launched in 2014; Serum Institute's oral polio vaccine, which became a bestseller for the company. It was reported that he planned to expand the product portfolio to include vaccines for dengue, flu and cervical cancer during the same year.
Presently he is the CEO of Serum Institute of India.

On 31 May 2021, he was appointed as the chairman of Magma Fincorp, after acquiring a 66% stake in the financial services company.

Threats demanding COVID-19 vaccines 
In an interview with ‘The Times’, Poonawalla declared that he left India for London because of threats demanding COVID-19 vaccines. Poonawalla also said that he will start Covid vaccine production outside India in addition to the ongoing production in India. He was provided with ‘Y’ category security by the Indian government as the threats were made public.

Philanthropy 
In 2020, SII announced that it would donate $66 million to the University of Oxford to fund the creation of the Poonawalla Vaccines Research Building.

Awards

 In 2016, he was listed by GQ Magazine and awarded Philanthropist of the year.
 In 2017, he received Humanitarian Endeavour Award In Hall of Fame Awards 2017 and was also awarded as Indian of the Year in CSR Business Category on CNN-News18
 In 2018, Chief Minister Devendra Fadnavis presented the ET Edge Maharashtra Achievers Awards of Business Leader of the Year to Poonawala, he further received CNBC Asia's award for Corporate Social Responsibility in the same year
 In 2020, Poonawalla was included in a Fortune magazine's '40 Under 40' listing in the healthcare category.
In 2021, Adar has been adjudged Entrepreneur of the Year by Economic Times for unparalleled contribution in fighting Covid-19 by successfully supplying huge quantities of Covishield in India and globally, a vaccine developed by Oxford-AstraZeneca and produced in India by Serum Institute.
In 2021, Adar was included on the Time 100, Times annual list of the 100 most influential people in the world.

References

External links 
 Official website

1981 births
Living people
People educated at St Edmund's School Canterbury
Alumni of the University of Westminster
Indian billionaires
Indian chief executives
Businesspeople from Pune
Indian businesspeople in the pharmaceutical industry
21st-century Indian businesspeople
Parsi people